Huillolluni (possibly from Aymara and Quechua willullu poor / orphan, Aymara -ni a suffix to indicate ownership, "the one with an orphan")  is a mountain in the Vilcanota mountain range in the Andes of Peru, about  high. It is situated in the Cusco Region, Quispicanchi Province, Marcapata District, and in the Paucartambo Province, Kosñipata District. Huillolluni lies north-east of the mountain Jolljepunco and north-west of the mountain Ancahuachana.

References

Mountains of Peru
Mountains of Cusco Region